Birds in the Spring is a Silly Symphonies animated Disney short film. It was released in 1933.

Plot

Various birds are seen building nests and caring for eggs. One pair anxiously awaits the hatching of three eggs, then joyfully summon all the other birds to see their new hatchlings. Time jumps forward to when the hatchlings are fully fledged, learning to sing and fly. One becomes lost and explores the ground, encountering grasshoppers, humming birds and then a rattlesnake that attempts to eat the baby bird. The bird manages to lead the snake into tying itself into a knot, but the chick takes shelter in a hornet's nest. The parents rescue it from the angry hornets, and the film ends with the father bird spanking the chick.

Reception
On March 21, 1933, The Film Daily said: "One of the niftiest little numbers of its kind to come along. Workmanship is the height of color cartoon art, and the idea in back of the action is both clever and highly amusing. It shows birds nesting in the spring, with the mother eventually hatching a trio of youngsters, who are then taught to sing, fly, etc. For kids or grownups, it's a pip."

Voice cast
 Purv Pullen, Clarence Nash, Marion Darlington: Birds
 Dorothy Compton: Baby Birds
 Clarence Nash: Bees

Home media
The short was released on December 19, 2006, on Walt Disney Treasures: More Silly Symphonies, Volume Two. Prior to that, the featurette also appeared on the Walt Disney Cartoon Classics Limited Gold Edition: Silly Symphonies VHS in the 1980s.

References

External links
 

1933 films
1933 short films
1930s Disney animated short films
Silly Symphonies
1933 animated films
Films directed by David Hand
Films produced by Walt Disney
Animated films about birds
1930s color films
Animated films about animals
American animated short films
Animated films without speech